Roy Berocay (born 21 February 1955) is a journalist and an author of children's literature from Uruguay.

He received the Premio Libro de Oro and Premio Bartolomé Hidalgo, also the Premio Alas for his contribution to the national culture.

Works 
Saga del Sapo Ruperto (Saga of Ruperto the toad):
1994, Las aventuras del sapo ruperto 
1997, Ruperto detective 
1999, Ruperto insiste 
1995, Ruperto de terror III 
1999,Ruperto al rescate 
Ruperto contraataca
1994, El abuelo más falopeado del mundo 
1997, Lucas, el fantastico 
1998, Siete cuentos sin sapo 
La triologia juvenil:
1998, Pequeña Ala 
2001, La niebla 
2004,Tan azul 
1993, Pateando Lunas 
1999, Los telepiratas 
1999, Babu
2000, Un mundo perfecto 
2001, El país de chorros 1 y 2 
2005, Las semillas de merca 
2020, Superniña.

See also
 List of Uruguayan writers

References

Uruguayan male writers
Uruguayan composers
Uruguayan children's writers
Spanish-language writers
Living people
1955 births
Premio Bartolomé Hidalgo